Kyzyl-Bulak is a village in the Kara-Kulja District, Osh Region, southern Kyrgyzstan. Its population was 370 in 2021.

References

Populated places in Osh Region